The Duke of Parma and Piacenza was the ruler of the Duchy of Parma and Piacenza, a historical state of Northern Italy, which existed between 1545 and 1802, and again from 1814 to 1859.

The Duke of Parma was also Duke of Piacenza, except for the first years of the rule of Ottavio Farnese (1549–1556), and the time of the Napoleonic wars, when the two were established as separate positions held by two different individuals. The Duke of Parma also usually held the title of Duke of Guastalla from 1746 (when Francis I, Holy Roman Emperor occupied the Duchy of Guastalla after the last Gonzaga duke died childless) until 1847 (when the territory was ceded to Modena), except for the Napoleonic era, when Napoleon's sister Pauline was briefly Duchess of Guastalla and of Varella. The last duke, Robert I, was driven from power in a revolution following France and Sardinia's victory over Austria. Its territory was merged into Sardinia in 1860.

The position is currently claimed by a member of the House of Bourbon-Parma. A recent pretender to the extinct Parmese throne, the late Carlos-Hugo, was also a pretender to the Spanish throne in the 1970s (see Carlism).

Reigning Dukes of Parma and Piacenza (1545–1802)

House of Farnese 1545–1731

House of Bourbon 1731–1735

House of Habsburg 1735–1748

House of Bourbon-Parma 1748–1802

French dukedoms of Parma (1808–1814)
These did not actually rule over any territory of Parma and Piacenza, but were of the honorary, hereditary type duché grand-fief, granted by Napoleon I in 1808.

Reigning dukes of Parma (1814–1859)

House of Habsburg-Lorraine, 1814–1847

Napoléon François Joseph Charles Bonaparte, the son of Marie Louise and Napoleon I, was at one time in the line of succession, but he was never Duke of Parma.

House of Bourbon-Parma, 1847–1859

See also
Pretenders to the throne of Parma
 Timeline of Parma

References

Parma, Duke of
Parma, Duke of
Parma, Duke of
Noble titles created in 1808